Taeniophallus is a genus of snakes of the family Colubridae.

Species
 Taeniophallus brevirostris (Peters, 1863)
 Taeniophallus nebularis Schargel, Rivas & Myers, 2005
 Taeniophallus nicagus (Cope, 1868)

References 

Taeniophallus
Snake genera
Taxa named by Edward Drinker Cope